Sir William Lorenzo Parker, 3rd Baronet (9 January 1889 – 27 October 1971) was a British rower who competed in the 1912 Summer Olympics.

Parker was born in Kensington London. He inherited the baronetcy on the death of Sir William Biddulph Parker, 2nd Baronet on 23 January 1902. He was educated at New College, Oxford. He was a member of the New College eight which won the silver medal for Great Britain rowing at the 1912 Summer Olympics.

In April 1913, Parker was appointed Assistant Inspector by the Board of Agriculture and Fisheries. Parker was Lord Lieutenant of Brecknockshire from 1959 to 1964.

References

External links
profile

1889 births
1971 deaths
Alumni of New College, Oxford
English male rowers
British male rowers
Olympic rowers of Great Britain
Rowers at the 1912 Summer Olympics
Olympic silver medallists for Great Britain
Baronets in the Baronetage of the United Kingdom
Lord-Lieutenants of Brecknockshire
Olympic medalists in rowing
Medalists at the 1912 Summer Olympics